Longgang may refer to the following locations in mainland China or Taiwan:

County-level divisions
Longgang, Zhejiang
Longgang District, Huludao, Liaoning
Longgang District, Shenzhen, Guangdong

Towns
Longgang, Jiangsu, in Yandu District, Yancheng

Written as "":
Longgang, Fengshun County, Guangdong
Longgang, Kaiyang County, in Kaiyang County, Guizhou
Longgang, Linqu County, in Linqu County, Shandong
Longgang, Hangzhou, in Lin'an District, Hangzhou, Zhejiang

Written as ""
Longgang, Yangxin County, Hubei, in Yangxin County, Hubei
Longgang, Qinshui County, in Qinshui County, Shanxi

Others
Longgang volcanic field
Longgang railway station, in Miaoli County, Taiwan